Teatersville is an unincorporated community in Garrard County, Kentucky, United States. Its post office is closed.

References

Unincorporated communities in Kentucky
Unincorporated communities in Garrard County, Kentucky